Meristogenys macrophthalmus is a species of frog in the family Ranidae. It is endemic to Sarawak in northern Borneo (Malaysia) and is only known from its type locality in the Bintulu District. The specific name macrophthalmus  is derived from the Greek words macros (="large") and ophthalmos (="eye") and refers to the large eyes of this frog. Common names Matsui's Borneo frog, large-eyed torrent frog, and big-eyed torrent frog have been coined for it.

Description
The body is moderately stout. The snout is somewhat blunt. The eyes are large (diameter ). The tympanum is distinct and also relatively large. The fingers and the toes bear round discs; the toes are fully webbed. Skin is shagreened above. There is a low, glandular dorsolateral fold. The flanks are coarsely granular, the throat smooth, and the venter rugose. Coloration of living animals is unknown; the preserved specimen is grayish-brown dorsal with some indistinct markings. The upper lip is whitish. The limbs have crossbars dorsally. The underside is whitish.

Habitat and conservation
Meristogenys macrophthalmus live primary, hilly, lowland rainforest. Breeding takes place in streams. It is threatened by habitat loss (clear-cutting).

References

macrophthalmus
Amphibians of Borneo
Amphibians of Malaysia
Endemic fauna of Borneo
Endemic fauna of Malaysia
Amphibians described in 1986
Taxa named by Masafumi Matsui
Taxonomy articles created by Polbot